Katharine "Kati" Jansen  (born 12 February 1934) is a retired German freestyle swimmer who won a bronze medal at the 1954 European Aquatics Championships. She competed at the 1952 and 1956 Summer Olympics in the 100 m and 4 × 100 m freestyle events and finished fourth in the relay in 1956.

References

1934 births
Living people
German female swimmers
Swimmers at the 1952 Summer Olympics
Swimmers at the 1956 Summer Olympics
German female freestyle swimmers
Olympic swimmers of Germany
Olympic swimmers of the United Team of Germany
European Aquatics Championships medalists in swimming
Female Olympic competitors
20th-century German women
21st-century German women